Gözebaşı can refer to:

 Gözebaşı, Adıyaman
 Gözebaşı, Elâzığ
 Gözebaşı, Kocaköy
 Gözebaşı, Şenkaya